The following is a list of selected cemeteries in Poland. 
Due to the complicated history of Poland millions of Poles are buried in former Poland (e.g. Lviv and Vilnius), the former Soviet Union (Katyn) or around the world in countries such as Iran and France.

Lesser Poland Voivodeship

 Rakowicki Cemetery, Kraków (Old Town). Buried, include pilots shot down over Poland with those originally buried in Warsaw, along with hundreds of Commonwealth of Nations casualties and prisoners of war who died during the German occupation.
 Wawel Cathedral with tombs of Polish kings, Kraków (St. Leonard's Crypt)
 Skałka national Panthéon of some of the most distinguished Poles, Kraków
 New Jewish Cemetery, Kraków (Kazimierz district)
 Remah Cemetery, Kraków (Kazimierz)
 Jewish Cemetery of Podgórze (pl), Kraków (Podgórze district)
 Mogilski cemetery (pl), Kraków (Nowa Huta district)
 Prokocim cemetery (pl), Kraków (Prokocim)
 Salwatorski cemetery (pl), Kraków (Zwierzyniec)
 Tyniecki cemetery (pl), Kraków (Dębniki)
 Jewish cemetery of Chrzanów
 Bieńczyce-Dłubnia Military Cemetery number 398. A single grave of an Austrian soldier which was named a 'cemetery' by the War Graves Branch K&K of the Austrian Military Commandant's Office of Kraków located in the Kraków Fortress of district XI (Twierdza Kraków) in southern Poland. For several decades, the grave was located near the contemporary Makuszyński street. It was removed in the mid 20th century during the construction of a major thoroughfare.

Lublin Voivodeship
 Old Jewish Cemetery, Lublin

Łódź Voivodeship
 Jewish Cemetery, Łódź

Masovian Voivodeship

 Powązki Cemetery in Warsaw (Wola district)
 Bródno Jewish Cemetery, Warsaw (Targówek district)
 Warsaw Insurgents Cemetery (Wola)
 Soviet Military Cemetery, Warsaw
 Jewish Cemetery, Warsaw (one of the largest Jewish cemeteries in the world)

 Palmiry massacre Cemetery
 Evangelical-Augsburg Cemetery, Warsaw
 Protestant Reformed Cemetery, Warsaw
 Orthodox Cemetery, Warsaw

Podlaskie Voivodeship
 Jewish Cemeteries in:
 Lipsk nad Bierbzą
 Suwałki
 Sejny
 Białystok
 Jedwabne (matzevot missing and/or destroyed)
 Augustów
 Multiple other cemeteries  (in varying conditions of preservation and maintenance)
 Lipka Tatar Cemetery in Kruszyniany (Muslim Cemetery))
 Multiple Roman and Greek (including Russian Orthodox) Catholic cemeteries, including in Krynki

Greater Poland Voivodeship
 Jewish cemeteries in Ostrów Wielkopolski
 Junikowo in Poznań
 Miłostowo in Poznań

Pomeranian Voivodeship
 Łostowicki Cemetery in Gdańsk
 Chełm-Gdańsk Cemetery

West Pomeranian Voivodeship
 Central Cemetery in Szczecin

Silesian Voivodeship
 Mater Dolorosa cemetery in Bytom
 Old Jewish cemetery, Cieszyn
 War cemetery in Łazy

Lower Silesian Voivodeship
 Osobowice Cemetery in Wrocław
 Old Jewish Cemetery, Wrocław

Świętokrzyskie Voivodeship
 Jewish Cemetery, Kielce
 Jewish cemetery in Wiślica

Podkarpackie Voivodeship
 Jewish Cemetery of Tarnobrzeg

Notes

 Cmentarze24.pl: search engine of over 700 cemeteries in Poland.

Poland
Cemeteries
 
Jewish cemeteries in Poland